Utopioid is the sixth full-length album by post-metal band Rosetta, released in 2017.

In stark contrast to when guitarist/vocalist Eric Jernigan "brought a tasteful degree of post-hardcore/emo influence into their stark sound for their fifth album, 2015’s Quintessential Ephemera," stated reviewer Matt Matheson, "on Utopioid, Rosetta has proudly stated that the composition process was more balanced and communal than ever before, and it shows." Echoes and Dust reviewer Tim Porter praised the album, saying "Utopioid is the best work the band has produced since its debut in 2005. This album will be on a lot of people’s top ten at the end of the year. It’s fantastic."

Track listing

Personnel
 Mike Armine - vocals, electronics
 Dave Grossman - bass, vocals
 Eric Jernigan - guitars, vocals, keyboards
 Bruce McMurtrie Jr. - drums, percussion, vocals
 Matt Weed - guitar, vocals, keyboards

References

2017 albums
Rosetta (band) albums
Self-released albums